Gizmodgery is the fifth studio album by alternative pop/rock band Self. It released in 2000 by Spongebath Records. The LP was recorded entirely with children's toy instruments. It was released in the short-lived HDCD format.

The album contains a cover of the Doobie Brothers' hit song "What a Fool Believes". "Trunk Fulla Amps" appears twice on the album, the second version with the expletives removed. The song references and parodies a variety of rock artists, including Freddie Mercury/Queen, ELO, Glenn Danzig/Danzig, and Lenny Kravitz. The Japanese import version of the album contains the bonus track "Resurrect", and alternate artwork.

Two songs from Breakfast with Girls ("Suzy Q Sailaway" and "Uno Song") had originally been recorded for inclusion on Gizmodgery but they were added to Breakfast at the insistence of DreamWorks Records.

Critical reception
The Pitch called the album "brilliantly conceived," writing that "even beyond the novelty of the toys’ sound, Gizmodgery is an enjoyable, diverse listening experience, as Self conjures up images of everyone from Queen and Jellyfish to the Doobie Brothers, whose 'What a Fool Believes' Self covers with disarming reverence."

Track listing

Personnel
Engineer - Matt Mahaffey (tracks: 1-4,6,8-11,14), Shawn McLean (tracks: 5,7,12,13)
Mastering - Tom Baker
Mixing - Chris James
Writer, Performer - Chris James (tracks: 5,7,12,13), Jason Rawlings (tracks: 5,6,7,12,13), Mac Burrus (tracks: 5,6,7,12,13), Matt Mahaffey (tracks: 1-9, 11-14), Mike Mahaffey (tracks: 5,7,12,13)

References

External links
http://www.self-centered.org The Self Fan Community - lyrics and other information

2000 albums
Self (band) albums